The High Tide Organ was a tidal organ  tall constructed in 2002 as part of "The Great Promenade Show" series of sculptures situated along Blackpool's New Promenade in the UK. It was removed in early 2022.
The artwork, described as a "musical manifestation of the sea", is one of a few examples of a tidal organ; others include the San Francisco Wave Organ and the Sea Organ in Croatia.

Design 
The sculpture was designed by the artists Liam Curtin and John Gooding, and was constructed in concrete, steel, zinc and copper sheet. The harnessing of wave energy, and the sculpting of the concrete and metals, is said to produce a unique interpretation of Blackpool's natural and man-made environments.

The instrument is played by the sea at high tide through eight pipes attached to the sea wall. These are connected under the promenade to 18 organ pipes within the sculpture. The swell of seawater at high tide pushes air up the sea-wall pipes and causes the organ pipes to sound. The best time to hear the High Tide Organ is two to three hours before or after high tide. On very calm days the organ is silent for part of its cycle. The pitches of the pipes are based on the harmonic series in B flat.

The High Tide Organ is one of a small group of musical instruments that operate without further human intervention, among which the aeolian harp and the wind chime are the most notable.

History 
In 2019, Curtin made an official complaint regarding the state of the instrument, alleging a lack of maintenance had caused safety concerns. After inspection, a health and safety surveyor determined that the instrument needed annual safety checks.

In 2021, Curtin called for the instrument to be demolished, stating that "For almost 20 years, I’ve been begging the council to maintain this and other works, in some cases for public safety reasons. I have even, at my own cost, done some maintenance on it myself." The heavily corroded sculpture was removed on 15th December 2021.

See also
Singing Ringing Tree
 Chillida's Comb of the Wind (in San Sebastián / Donostia, Basque Country, Spain)

References

External links

The Great Promenade Show
UK Arts Council 360 degree view of the organ 

Buildings and structures in Blackpool
Organs (music)
Sound sculptures
Wind-activated musical instruments
2002 sculptures
Hydraulophones
Outdoor sculptures in England
2002 establishments in England
Buildings and structures demolished in 2021
Demolished buildings and structures in England